A list of films produced in Spain in 1956 (see 1956 in film).

1956

External links
 Spanish films of 1956 at the Internet Movie Database

1956
Spanish
Films